Soheir El Bably (14 February 1937 – 21 November 2021) was an Egyptian actress.

Biography
After completing secondary school, she attended the Institute of Theatrical Arts. She starred in the play Madraset El Moshaghbeen (1973), and also in a stage version of the life of Raya and Sakina with famous actress Shadia in 1985. She co-starred in Moment of Weakness (1981) with famous actor Salah Zulfikar. She got married for five times, and her second husband was Mounir Mourad.

Selected filmography

Films
 1959: The Unknown Woman
 1961: Rendezvous with the Past
 1967: The Most Dangerous Man in the World
 1981: A Moment of Weakness
 1982: An Egyptian Story
 1988: Busting Bakiza and Zaghloul

Stage
 1973: Madrast Al-Mushaghebeen
 1978: Masyadet Ragel Motazaweg
 1983: Raya W Sekeena

Television
 1977: The Truth..That Unknown
 1986: Bakiza and Zaghloul

References

External links 
 
 On Film Base

1937 births
2021 deaths
Egyptian film actresses
People from Damietta
20th-century Egyptian actresses
21st-century Egyptian actresses
Egyptian stage actresses